Cyperus purpureoviridis is a species of sedge that is endemic to Tanzania.

The species was first formally described by the botanist Kåre Arnstein Lye in 1983.

See also
 List of Cyperus species

References

purpureoviridis
Plants described in 1983
Flora of Tanzania
Taxa named by Kåre Arnstein Lye